Heather Dawn Sweet (born August 23, 1981) is a Canadian politician who serves as a Member of the Legislative Assembly of Alberta, representing the riding of Edmonton-Manning. She was elected in the 2015 Alberta election as a member of the New Democratic Party, and she was re-elected in 2019.

Personal life 
Before entering politics, Sweet worked as a registered social worker for more than 10 years, with one year working with the Métis Child and Family Services Society. Sweet worked in child protection services focusing on high-risk youth from 2005 to 2015.

Electoral history

2019 general election

2015 general election

References

1981 births
Alberta New Democratic Party MLAs
Canadian trade unionists
Living people
Politicians from Edmonton
Women MLAs in Alberta
21st-century Canadian politicians
21st-century Canadian women politicians